The First Time I Turned Twenty (original title: La Première fois que j'ai eu 20 ans) is a 2004 French comedy film directed and written by Lorraine Lévy.

Plot
The action takes place in the early 1960s in the Paris suburbs. Hannah Goldman (Marilou Berry), sixteen and Jewish, has two very pretty sisters and parents who love her. But she is not happy, feeling herself ugly due to being overweight, and she deeply nourishes a terrible complex at the beauty of her sisters and that of her school friend. But Hannah has two great qualities her sisters admit to both not possessing and envying: she's smart, and she has a talent for music.

Wishing to make a career in music, she chooses an instrument that looks like her ... the double bass, an instrument that is traditionally viewed as a "male instrument". But her musical nonconformity does not stop there: she dreams of entering the jazz band at her high school. This year the jazz band needs a new bassist. But there have never been any women in the jazz band, established now for many years by the high school music teacher, and in addition, this instrument's position is traditionally held by a man, and for a woman to claim this instrument in training deeply shocks all the high school boys.

Or in the selection contest it performs a benefit much higher than that of the only other competitor. She wins the selection competition, to the delight of her family. But her four musician comrades, viscerally misogynist, very attached to the male tradition of their training, and also singularly lacking all subtlety as any courtesy, will try everything to discourage it. Beginning immediately by reminding her that she is a woman, and that they do not want a woman in their training, they harass her in order to gradually undermine her morale. They go one evening to plot a sinister Nazi symbol on her scores played during a concert, and what is even worse in her eyes ... they try to humiliate her by attacking hher instrument.

Struggling against the discouragement month after month and use all her intelligence and patience, stimulated by her uncle, she will eventually win the admiration of part of the group of four boys.

Cast
 Marilou Berry as Hannah Goldman
 Catherine Jacob as Madame Goldman
 Serge Riaboukine as Meyer Goldman
 Pierre Arditi as Uncle Jérémy
 Nathalie Courval as Aunt Lucie
 Myriam Moraly as Judith
 Stéphanie Pasterkamp as Sandra
 Raphaël Personnaz as Louis
 Michel Vuillermoz as M. Conrad
 Laurent Spielvogel as M. Troutman
 Catherine Arditi as Madame Sarah
 Adrien Jolivet as David
 Guillaume Destrem as Jérémy's lover
 Romain Vissol as Jo
 Didier Becchetti as Jip
 Sophie Guiter as Mlle Appelbaum
 Erwan Demaure as Denis
 Renan Mazéas as Emile
 Joséphine Serre as Myriam
 Maroussia Dubreuil as Ruth
 Louis Descols as Robert
 Stéphane Rugraff as Jean-Jean

References

External links

2004 films
French comedy films
2004 comedy films
Jazz films
Films directed by Lorraine Lévy
2000s French films